is a Japanese three-part animated military mecha alternate history film based on an anime television series with the same name co-created by director Gorō Taniguchi and writer Ichirō Ōkouchi. The three-part film was directed by Taniguchi, written by Ōkouchi, and produced by Sunrise. The first film, Initiation, was released on October 21, 2017. The second film, Transgression, was released on February 10, 2018. The third film, Glorification, was released on May 26, 2018.

The three-part film is a compilation of the television series, but with differences in storylines that makes it a separate continuity, and setting up for the sequel film, Code Geass Lelouch of the Re;surrection, which was released in 2019.

Premise

Initiation
In an alternative reality, the Holy Empire of Britannia has conquered the world, with their imperial family dominating countries and stripping former authorities and civilians of their national pride, including Japan which has been renamed as "Area 11" and its people "Elevens". Lelouch is a member of the imperial family alongside his little sister Nunnally; however, after the death of their mother, their father exiled them to Area 11, formerly known as Japan, and they were presumed dead by the Britannian empire. Now a teenager and living under a new identity, Lelouch meets a mysterious girl named C.C. and is given the power of Geass, allowing him to control someone with a single command. With his new God-given gift, intelligence and insider knowledge of the Holy Britannian Empire, he takes up the mantle of the mysterious rebel named "Zero" to give hope back to the Elevens and gain his revenge against his own family.

Transgression
Lelouch Lamperouge, under the secret identity of Zero, has gained supports of the Elevens as well as made himself a target for the Britannian army, but his main concern right now is not only protecting his sister but getting his best friend, Suzaku, to join their side. When Suzaku fails to be persuaded however, he finds that the price to pay for taking down the father that once killed his mother has a heavy cost, one that will take Lelouch to his limit.

Glorification
Lelouch takes a big risk and decides to confront Suzaku alone, not only to help him win his war but to also protect the one person he cares about most of all – Nunnally. Suzaku refuses at first but his resolve is tested when he discovers Emperor Charles zi Britannia's master plan and the true motives of Schneizel el Britannia. But how far can Lelouch's Geass take him and will he be able to create the world of peace he wants for Nunnally in the end?

Voice cast

Production
In June 2017, it was announced that a three-part compilation film of Code Geass was in the works, with series director Gorō Taniguchi and writer Ichirō Ōkouchi returning for the films. Taniguchi confirmed that while the films are recap of the television series, there are few changes to the storylines, creating a "what if?" scenarios leading up to the sequel film. Many of the key staff members from the television series were credited for their respective roles; manga artist group CLAMP for their character design concept, with Takahiro Kimura as an animation character designer, and Kōtarō Nakagawa and Hitomi Kuroishi for their musical scores.

The voice cast from the television series reprised their respective roles to re-record their old dialogues and new ones for the new scenes.

The opening songs from the television series were used in the compilation films' openings. The new ending songs were announced: , sung by Iris was used in Initiation, "The Moon", sung by Sakura Fujiwara, was used in Transgression, and "NE:ONE", sung by Survive Said the Prophet, was used in Glorification.

Release
The three-part film was released in Japanese theaters; Initiation was released on October 21, 2017, Transgression was released on February 10, 2018, and Glorification on May 26, 2018.

Reception

Box office
Transgression debuted at number eight in the Japanese box office.

Critical reception
James Beckett of Anime News Network gave the three-part film "C+" rating, and states "If you like your robot wars filled with magic, melodrama, and more beautiful CLAMP boys than you can shake a stick at, then the original Code Geass will likely be worth your time." Comic Book Resources published an article listing places where—in writer Liz Adler's opinion—the films improved upon the anime, and where the original anime was better. Panos Kotzathanasis of Asian Movie Pulse gave a mostly positive review of Initiation. Sarah Rawlings of Anime UK News rated Initiation 7/10.

Sequel

The sequel was teased when the three-part film was first announced. In August 2018, it was revealed that the sequel is going to be an anime film, and returning key staff and cast members from the anime television series and the three-part film were announced for the film. The sequel film, titled  was released in Japanese theaters on February 9, 2019.

Notes

References

External links
  
 

Anime film series
Animated films about time travel
Code Geass
Cyborgs in anime and manga
Discrimination in fiction
Fiction about curses
Films about prophets
Films about security and surveillance
Films about terrorism
Films set in the 2110s
Films with screenplays by Ichirō Ōkouchi
Funimation
Japan in fiction
Japanese alternate history films
Monarchy in fiction
Sunrise (company)
Terrorism in fiction

ja:コードギアス 反逆のルルーシュ#劇場版3部作